Fantom Technologies, Inc. was a Canadian household appliance company founded in Welland, Ontario in 1986 as IONA Appliances, with offices in Buffalo, New York, U.S. A manufacturer of dual-cyclonic type vacuum cleaners, they were inspired from the Dyson vacuums (which would not appear in North America until 2002). Its later name was adopted in 1995. Fantom went bankrupt in October 2001 and their vacuums have been considered collector's items since.

History
In 1989, British-born James Dyson (inventor of dual-cyclone vacuums) and Canada's IONA Appliances (the predecessor of Fantom Technologies) made a licensing deal in which the company would manufacture and sell a line of commercial dual-cyclonic upright vacuums called Vectron, for SC Johnson Wax, on which Dyson held the patent. Two years later, SC Johnson exited the commercial vacuum business and IONA renamed the vacuums to "Fantom". 1993 brought a successful infomercial for the original Fantom vacuum. One year later, the vacuum offered a HEPA filter as an option. In 1995, the vacuum was renamed the Fantom Thunder (AKA Kenmore Destiny).

Later models
Fantom Fury

In 1996, IONA Appliances became Fantom Technologies, Inc. and introduced the Fantom Fury. The vacuum was smaller than the Thunder unit and was lighter and less expensive. Again, it achieved success through a television infomercial. It was less able to clean carpets due to a weaker motor.

Fantom Lightning

Fantom Technologies offered a canister-style vacuum in 1998 called the Fantom Lightning. It was sold at a price of $329 through a television infomercial hosted by Jim Caldwell (and produced by his then-business Future Thunder Productions). Again, it sold well, but the vacuum had defects including a like poor handle release on the power nozzle and poor wand and hose design.

Fantom Cyclone XT

A later model was the Fantom Cyclone XT, released in 1999. Sold again through an infomercial hosted by Cheryl Watson and Jim Caldwell, the vacuum was engineered similar to the Lightning, but as upright. It was successful.

Fantom Crosswinds

James Dyson ended his partnership with Fantom Technologies in early 2001. That same year, Fantom released a single-cyclone vacuum called the Fantom Crosswinds, which unlike the previous vacuums, was a failure due clogging problems.

Fantom Wildcat

The Wildcat which is equivalent to Westinghouse Unplugged.

Bankruptcy
In October 2001, Fantom Technologies went bankrupt, and the name was sold to Euro-Pro (owned by Mark Rosenzweig). James Dyson saw an opportunity and introduced a multi-cyclonic vacuum under the Dyson name in North America in 2002, called the DC07, one year after Fantom went out of business. The Dyson DC07, as well as later Dyson models, would be commercial best-sellers in North America. Today, Fantom vacuums are considered collector's items.

References

Vacuum cleaner manufacturers
Defunct companies of Ontario
1986 establishments in Ontario
2001 disestablishments in Ontario
Home appliance manufacturers of Canada